Antoinette Najeeb (February 20, 1930 - August 17, 2022) was a Syrian actress.

Biography
Najeeb was born in Daraa, Syria in 1930.

In 1968, her career began when she joined the Actors Syndicate, Syria. She was previously married to actor Youssef Choueiri.

Filmography
 Naked Without Sin (1967)
 Sah El Nom (1972)
 Apartment of Love (1973)
 A Confused Woman (1973)
 Mirrors (2000)
 The Four Seasons
 Wiladah Min Al Khasira
 Jasmine collar
 Prohibited Love
 Little Hearts
 Men Wanted
 Al-Shared

References

External links
 

1930 births
2022 deaths
20th-century Syrian actresses